La Barceloneta is a locality located in the municipality of La Vansa i Fórnols, in Province of Lleida province, Catalonia, Spain. As of 2020, it has a population of 7.

Geography 
La Barceloneta is located 146km northeast of Lleida.

References

Populated places in the Province of Lleida